Do Ab (also Romanized as Do Āb) is a village in Jamabrud Rural District, in the Central District of Damavand County, Tehran Province, Iran. At the 2006 census, its population was 36, with 14 families.

References 

Populated places in Damavand County